The 2021 Super GT Series was a motor racing championship based in Japan for grand touring cars. The series is sanctioned by the Japan Automobile Federation (JAF) and run by the GT Association (GTA). It was the twenty-ninth season of the Japan Automobile Federation Super GT Championship which includes the All Japan Grand Touring Car Championship (JGTC) era, and the seventeenth season under the Super GT name. It was the thirty-ninth overall season of a national JAF sportscar championship, dating back to the All Japan Sports Prototype Championship.

TGR Team au TOM'S and drivers Yuhi Sekiguchi and Sho Tsuboi won the GT500 class championships, driving the Toyota Supra, after overcoming a 16-point deficit in the final round of the season. The titles were secured in controversial circumstances as championship leader Naoki Yamamoto of Team Kunimitsu was taken out from a title-clinching position by GT300 class driver Ren Sato with 15 laps remaining in the final race of the season. Driving the new Subaru BRZ, Takuto Iguchi and Hideki Yamauchi won the GT300 class championships for R&D Sport, giving Subaru their first-ever title in Super GT competition. It was also the first drivers' title for both Iguchi and Yamauchi, and the first for the R&D Sport team.

Calendar
A provisional eight-round 2021 calendar was announced on 7 August 2020. Autopolis, Okayama International Circuit, and Sportsland Sugo returned to the calendar after a year's absence. The Fuji GT 500km Race also returned to its traditional calendar slot on the Golden Week holiday of 3-4 May.

On 9 February 2021, the planned rounds at Chang International Circuit in Thailand and Sepang International Circuit in Malaysia were cancelled due to travel restrictions. A revised schedule was released on the same day with all eight rounds being held in Japan, and with the addition of an additional round at Fuji Speedway in November and Twin Ring Motegi in July. On 11 May 2021, the third round at Suzuka International Racing Course, which had been set to take place on 30 May as the third round of the championship, was postponed indefinitely due to a renewed wave of COVID-19 cases in Japan. The race was subsequently rescheduled to 22 August.

Circuits and dates

Teams and drivers

GT500

GT300

Driver Changes

GT500 Class 
 Honda
On 15 January 2020, Honda announced that Toshiki Oyu will be stepping up to GT500 to join Team Mugen, replacing Hideki Mutoh.
 Nissan: Nissan's GT500 driver line-up was announced on 18 January 2020. 
Nobuharu Matsushita, who made his series debut as a replacement driver for the injured Shinichi Takagi last year, signed with Nissan to compete for Team Impul alongside Kazuki Hiramine. 
Daiki Sasaki joined Kondo Racing for the first time since 2016, partnering with Mitsunori Takaboshi.
Jann Mardenborough was not retained by Nissan for the 2021 season.
 Toyota: Toyota Gazoo Racing announced their Super GT driver line-up on 22 January 2020.
At TOM's Racing, Sacha Fenestraz transferred from the number 36 to the number 37 entry, replacing Nick Cassidy, who left the series to compete in Formula E with Envision Virgin Racing.
Sho Tsuboi transferred from TGR Team ROOKIE to the number 36 TOM's team.
2019 champion Kenta Yamashita returned to Super GT full-time, replacing Tsuboi at TGR Team ROOKIE - and reunited with former Team LeMans teammate Kazuya Oshima in the No. 14 car.

GT300 Class 
 Three-time GT500 champion Satoshi Motoyama returned to the series after retiring from GT500 at the end of 2018, driving for the newly incorporated Team LeMans with Motoyama Racing (see Team Changes below).
Two-time GT500 and GT300 champion Masataka Yanagida joined pro-am Mercedes-AMG customer team Arnage Racing, racing alongside amateur driver Masaki Kano.
Former Ferrari Driver Academy prospect and Formula 2 driver Giuliano Alesi made his GT300 debut with arto Team Thailand. Alesi was initially signed as the team's third driver, but competed in all eight rounds after Nattapong Hortongkum was unable to enter Japan for a second consecutive year.
2019 F4 Japanese champion and 2020 French F4 Championship runner-up Ren Sato made his GT300 debut with Autobacs Racing Team Aguri, replacing Toshiki Oyu.
 Super Formula Lights driver Teppei Natori made his GT300 debut, replacing Kosuke Matsuura at Honda customer Team UPGarage.
 Yuui Tsutsumi, signed with Max Racing to compete full-time in 2021, after driving for three different teams (including Max Racing) as a substitute driver throughout 2020.
2020 TCR Japan Series champion Takuro Shinohara made his full-time GT300 debut with Audi Team Hitotsuyama, after competing part-time in 2020 for two different teams.
JLOC signed GT500 veteran Kosuke Matsuura and GT300 podium finisher Natsu Sakaguchi to drive their number 87 Lamborghini Huracán GT3.
Veteran GT300 driver Shogo Mitsuyama joined Yogibo Drago Corse, alongside owner/driver Ryo Michigami.
Japanese F4 graduate Reiji Hiraki made his GT300 debut with Team Mach, driving alongside his older brother Yuya.
Super Formula Lights graduate Yoshiaki Katayama made his GT300 debut with Team LeMans with Motoyama Racing.

Team Changes

GT500 Class 
 Team Red Bull Mugen changed tyre suppliers from Yokohama to Dunlop. Dunlop will supply multiple GT500 teams for the first time since 2010. Hirokatsu Tanaka replaced Shinji Nakano as team director.
TGR Team ROOKIE became a self-sufficient team after being operated by Team Cerumo in 2020. Eneos replaced Wako's as their title sponsor.
Stanley Electric replaced the defunct Raybrig brand as the title sponsor for Team Kunimitsu.
Hitachi Astemo, a joint venture between Hitachi and Honda, replaced the defunct Keihin brand as title sponsor for Astemo Real Racing.

GT300 Class 
 INGING Motorsport and  merged into a collaborative entry in 2021, known as muta Racing INGING. The team retained the Lotus Evora MC GT300 vehicle, driver , chief engineer Shintaro Watanabe, and the number 2 plate of Cars Tokai Dream28's entry. INGING brought on their Bridgestone tyre contract, title sponsor muta, and driver Ryohei Sakaguchi.
 Both LM Corsa and Max Racing switched from the FIA-GT3 specification Lexus RC F GT3 to the GT300 specification fifth-generation Toyota GR Supra for the 2021 season.
 Team LeMans returned to Super GT after a one-year absence, fielding an Audi R8 LMS Evo under the 'Team LeMans with Motoyama Racing' banner.
 R&D Sport changed from the first-generation Subaru BRZ (ZC6) to the new second-generation BRZ (ZD8) for the 2021 season.
 Car Guy Racing returned to Super GT after a two-year absence, partnering with Pacific Racing Team to field a Ferrari 488 GT3 under the Pacific CarGuy Racing banner.
Misato Haga, former team principal of Direxiv and the first woman to win a GT300 Championship as a team director, became the new team director of Drago Corse. Yogibo became the team's new title sponsor.
 D'Station Racing withdrew from Super GT at the end of the 2020 season. D'Station Racing will concentrate on FIA World Endurance Championship.

Mid-season Changes

GT500 Class 
 Sacha Fenestraz missed the first five races of the season due to difficulties acquiring a Japanese visa. Sena Sakaguchi replaced him at TGR Team KeePer TOM's for these five races, before Fenestraz returned for the sixth round at Autopolis.
 Tadasuke Makino missed the first race of the season due to meningitis. Hideki Mutoh replaced him at Team Kunimitsu for the first race at Okayama. Makino returned for the Fuji 500km in May, entered as a third driver alongside Yamamoto and Mutoh. From the following round at Motegi, Makino returned to the cockpit on a full-time basis.
From the third race of the season at Motegi, TGR Team ZENT Cerumo chief engineer Kotaro Tanaka had taken over as team director from ace driver Yuji Tachikawa.

GT300 Class 
 With Sena Sakaguchi driving in GT500, reigning FIA F4 Japanese Champion Hibiki Taira was called up to replace Sakaguchi at K-Tunes Racing. Taira drove in the first three races of the season. 
 Before the fourth race at Suzuka, Taira was replaced at K-Tunes Racing by Kazuto Kotaka, due to an undisclosed illness, which was later revealed to be a COVID-19 infection. Kotaka also drove in the fifth race at Sugo.
 Kohta Kawaai missed the fourth race of the season at Suzuka due to a positive COVID-19 test. 2011 GT300 champion Taku Bamba replaced Kawaai at Saitama Toyopet GreenBrave.
 2012 GT300 champion Naoki Yokomizo replaced Takeshi Kimura at Pacific CarGuy Racing for rounds three, four, and seven due to Kimura's driving commitments in the FIA World Endurance Championship.
 arto Ping An Team Thailand changed its entry name back to arto Team Thailand after the first two races of the season, after Ping An Insurance abruptly ended its sponsorship of the team.
R'Qs Motor Sports withdrew from the final two rounds after their car was heavily damaged in an accident during the sixth round at Autopolis.

Results
Drivers credited with winning Pole Position for their respective teams are indicated in bold text.

Championship Standings

Drivers' championships

Scoring system

GT500

GT300

Notes
1:The race at Suzuka Circuit was still promoted as the third round of the season, despite taking place after the July race at Twin Ring Motegi and being the fourth race of the season chronologically. Likewise, the July race at Motegi was still promoted as the fourth round of the championship, even though it was now the third race of the season chronologically.

References

External links 
 Super GT Official Website

Super GT seasons
Super GT Series
Super GT